Sam Skinner (born 29 June 1997) is a professional Australian rules footballer for the Port Adelaide Football Club in the Australian Football League (AFL), having initially been drafted to the Brisbane Lions. He was drafted by Brisbane with pick 47 in the 2015 national draft. After three games for the club, he was delisted at the conclusion of the 2020 season.

References

External links

 

1997 births
Living people
Brisbane Lions players
Gippsland Power players
Australian rules footballers from Victoria (Australia)
Port Adelaide Football Club players